Johan Mats Rikard Barne (born 4 April 1964 in Gothenburg) is a Swedish Olympic sailor in the Soling class. Barne competed in 1992, 1996 and 2000 Summer Olympics, finishing fifth in the Soling in the 1992 edition, 13th in 1996 and 7th in 2000.

He has received the honorary award ”Sailor of the Year” from the Swedish Sailing Federation six times, more than any other sailor.

References

External links
 
 
 

1964 births
Living people
Swedish male sailors (sport)
Olympic sailors of Sweden
5.5 Metre class sailors
World Champions in 5.5 Metre
TP52 class world champions
World champions in sailing for Sweden
Royal Gothenburg Yacht Club sailors
Sailors at the 1992 Summer Olympics – Soling
Sailors at the 1996 Summer Olympics – Soling
Sailors at the 2000 Summer Olympics – Soling
Sportspeople from Gothenburg